Dog Ear Creek is a stream in the U.S. state of South Dakota.

Dog Ear Creek has the name of a Sioux chief.

See also
List of rivers of South Dakota

References

Rivers of Tripp County, South Dakota
Rivers of South Dakota